Travis Wade Hughes (born May 25, 1978) is a former Major League Baseball relief pitcher. He has played in the majors for the Texas Rangers and the Washington Nationals (-).

In his three-season career in the major leagues, Hughes has posted a 6.31 ERA with 16 strikeouts in 25.2 innings pitched.

Hughes became a free agent after the 2006 season. The Boston Red Sox organization signed him to a minor league contract on December 20, 2006, and invited him to participate in the Red Sox'  spring training. Hughes spent the year as the closer for the Red Sox's Triple-A affiliate, the Pawtucket Red Sox. Hughes had 24 saves and an ERA of 1.91. Hughes signed with the Yokohama BayStars of Japan's Central League for the  season to serve as their closer. He was released on August 15, 2008.

A 2006 single in his only at-bat left Hughes with a rare MLB career batting average of 1.000.

Hughes last pitched for the York Revolution of the Atlantic League.

References

External links

1978 births
Living people
Baseball players from Kansas
American expatriate baseball players in Canada
American expatriate baseball players in Japan
Major League Baseball pitchers
Texas Rangers players
Cowley Tigers baseball players
Washington Nationals players
Oklahoma RedHawks players
New Orleans Zephyrs players
Pawtucket Red Sox players
York Revolution players
Yokohama BayStars players
Águilas Cibaeñas players
American expatriate baseball players in the Dominican Republic
Calgary Vipers players
Brockton Rox players